Robert Fenwick may refer to:

 Rob Fenwick, New Zealand businessman and environmentalist
 Bob Fenwick, English professional footballer 
 Bobby Fenwick, American baseball player
 Robert Cooke Fenwick, British aircraft designer